The 2001 FIFA Confederations Cup Final was a football match to determine the winners of the 2001 FIFA Confederations Cup. The match was held at International Stadium Yokohama, Yokohama, Japan, on 10 June 2001 and was contested by Japan and France. France won the match 1–0 with the only goal coming after half an hour, when Patrick Vieira headed in over the advancing keeper Yoshikatsu Kawaguchi from the edge of the penalty area after a long pass from Frank Leboeuf in midfield. This was Japan's first ever final in a senior FIFA competition, and as of 2022, it is also the one of only three senior FIFA finals to feature an AFC team.

Route to the final

Match details

References

External links
 Official Match report

Final
2001
Confederations Cup Final 2001
Confederations Cup Final 2001
Confederations Cup Final
Confederations Cup Final
June 2001 sports events in Asia
2000s in Yokohama